Dill Scallion is a 1999 feature film mockumentary that follows the rise and fall of a country-western singer, Dill Scallion.

Description
It was written and directed by Jordan Brady. It is best known for its eclectic cast including Lauren Graham, Kathy Griffin, David Koechner, Henry Winkler, Dave "Gruber" Allen, Wayne Federman, Jason Priestley, Robert Wagner, Dana Gould, Peter Berg, Michael Rodgers, Rachel Grate, and Spencer Garrett, as well as cameos from country western singers LeAnn Rimes, Travis Tritt, and Willie Nelson. Michael Rodgers and Sheryl Crow wrote most of the music for the film.

The film was released in 1999 only on VHS and a collectors edition was released on DVD in 2000.

Cast

External links 
 
 Austin Chronicle
 Box Office Magazine
 Film Threat
 Access Atlanta

1999 films
American mockumentary films
Films shot in Minnesota
Films shot in Texas
1999 comedy films
1990s English-language films
Films directed by Jordan Brady
1990s American films